FlixBus (styled FLiXBUS) is a German brand that offers intercity bus service in Europe, North America, and Brazil. It is owned by the mobility platform Flix SE (until April 2022: FlixMobility GmbH), which also operates Flixtrain, FlixCar,  and Greyhound Lines. As of June 2021, FlixMobility GmbH was valued at US$3 billion.

Flixbus operates buses or, in many cases, just handles marketing, pricing, and customer service for a commission, on behalf of bus operators on the list of FlixBus bus partners.

In 2018, the company had a 90% market share of intercity bus travel in Germany. As of February 2018, 60% of the company's customers were female and 33% were between the ages of 18 and 25.

History

Europe
FlixBus was founded in 2011 in Munich by Daniel Krauss, Jochen Engert and André Schwämmlein and launched its first three routes in February 2013 in Bavaria, Germany. It was founded to take advantage of Germany opening up its bus market to competition in 2013.

In January 2015, the company merged with MeinFernbus and adopted its green livery, replacing the previous blue.

In May 2015, it entered the liberalized French market with "FlixBus France", and in August it launched an Italian subsidiary in Milan.

In November 2015, FlixBus announced the establishment of a new subsidiary called FlixBus B.V. in the Netherlands, creating the very first national Dutch intercity bus network. At that time, it also had routes to Austria, Switzerland, Belgium, Luxembourg, Sweden and Denmark.

In January 2016, FlixBus announced it was entering Central and Eastern Europe with a new subsidiary FlixBus CEE, covering Czech Republic, Slovakia, Hungary, Romania, Poland, Slovenia and Croatia.

In March 2016, the company launched its first routes in the United Kingdom and Spain.

Effective 1 July 2016, FlixBus acquired Megabus Europe from Stagecoach Group, with Stagecoach remaining as contractor to operate the services.

On 3 August 2016, FlixBus announced the acquisition of Postbus, a German competitor, from Deutsche Post for an undisclosed sum.

In September 2016, FlixBus announced plans to expand to Scandinavia. Together with Danish small and medium-sized enterprises, FlixBus announced plans for a network in Denmark.

On 28 February 2017, FlixBus announced that Danish bus company Abildskou, based in Aarhus, would become its first bus partner in Denmark.

In May 2017, FlixBus announced it would take over the Hellö coach network from Austrian Federal Railways (ÖBB) in August 2017.

In 2017, FlixBus launched service in Portugal.

Starting on 24 August 2017, FlixBus cooperated with Czech train company LEO Express to take over the operation of the Locomore rail service between Stuttgart and Berlin (via Hanover and Frankfurt) in Germany.

On 24 March 2018, FlixMobility acquired the open-access operator Hamburg-Köln-Express, which operated a route between Hamburg and Cologne, and integrated the HKX route into the Flixtrain network alongside the above-mentioned Locomore service.

In April 2019, FlixBus acquired Eurolines and its Isilines brand from Transdev.

In August 2019, FlixBus acquired Turkish bus company Kâmil Koç from private equity firm Actera Group.

In July 2020, FlixBus launched intercity coach service in the United Kingdom, with routes from London to Birmingham, Bristol and Portsmouth (calling at Guildford) and resumed its services from London to mainland Europe. It also launched routes to Ukraine, Estonia, Latvia, and Lithuania. In April 2022, FlixMobility GmbH was renamed Flix SE. The umbrella brand FlixMobility was replaced by Flix.

North America
On 15 May 2018, FlixBus announced its expansion into the United States market, operating from a main hub in Los Angeles. In March 2019, the company launched service in Houston, San Antonio, New Orleans, Baton Rouge, and Biloxi, Mississippi. In May 2019, Eastern Bus, which operates along the Interstate 95 corridor between New York City and Richmond, Virginia, reached a deal with FlixBus to operate the East Coast network for FlixBus. On 21 October 2021, FlixBus acquired Greyhound Lines for US$78million.

In April 2022, FlixBus launched its Canadian operations with three routes in Ontario. and in May expanded into British Columbia with routes from Vancouver to Bellingham, Everett and Seattle in Washington State.

Brazil
On 1 December 2021, FlixBus launched service in Brazil in partnership with Expresso Adamantina, a Brazilian bus company.

Accidents and incidents
 On 19 May 2018, a bus rolled and crashed near Udine, Italy. There were 43 people on board, of which 26 were injured.
 On 5 May 2019, a bus crashed in Germany. At least three passengers were seriously injured. Initial police findings were that the bus driver was not at fault for the accident.
 On 19 May 2019, a bus rolled and crashed into a road safety barrier in Germany. One person was killed and 60 were injured.
 On 6 October 2019, a bus rolled and crashed near Bizanet. One person was killed and 17 were injured.
 On 3 November 2019, a bus rolled and crashed near Amiens, injuring more than 30 people.
 On 29 November 2019, a bus crashed on the New Jersey Turnpike, killing one passenger.
 On 17 August 2022 a baby boy was born on the Paris–Warsaw line, near the Poznań station.

Controversies

Working conditions
FlixBus has been accused of forcing its partners to make drivers work excessive hours at low wages; however, official inspections have found that resting, driving, and working hours in the market were much better than some media reports suggested.

Use of infrastructure without toll payments
Unlike train services and trucks, buses do not pay any road toll in Germany, criticized as a "hidden subsidy" by some German politicians. bdo (an association of German bus companies) responded by saying that buses already pay for infrastructure use in the form of related taxes (ex. mineral oil tax) while billions in subsidies are paid to national rail provider Deutsche Bahn.

Dominant market share
Following the acquisition of Postbus in 2016, FlixBus gained control of roughly 80% of the German long-distance bus market, a move criticised by various media outlets as a de facto monopoly and harmful to competition. It was also suggested that FlixBus' control of the market could lead to higher prices and less service to smaller destinations.

Passenger name records
On 25 June 2018, the Belgian Government announced that it was running a pilot project with FlixBus and Eurostar for which it is collecting all passenger data for FlixBuses and Eurostars crossing the Belgian border. The move was criticised as diverting resources from public transport.

Following protocols during the COVID-19 pandemic
In July 2020, the company's Swedish affiliate, FlixBuss AB, was criticized for not enforcing health protocols established by the Public Health Agency of Sweden during the COVID-19 pandemic.

Passenger discrimination 
On May 14, 2020, the Disability Rights Legal Center (DRLC) filed a federal nationwide class action lawsuit in a California U.S. District Court against FlixBus Inc., TourCoach Charter & Tours, and USA Coach Services, on behalf of Francisco Serrano and all passengers who use a wheelchair, scooter, or other mobility aid. The lawsuit, brought under the Americans with Disabilities Act and California’s Unruh Civil Rights Act, seeks damages and an injunction to ensure that FlixBus passengers with disabilities are able to use the nationwide service without hassle, humiliation, extra time, or cost.

References

External links 

 

Bus companies of Germany
Companies based in Munich
German companies established in 2011
International bus transport in Europe
Transport companies established in 2011
Intercity bus companies of the United States
Intercity bus companies of Canada
FlixBus